Marcin Dziewulski (born 24 October 1982, in Tarnowskie Góry) is a retired Polish footballer and current head coach of Ruch Radzionków.

Career

Club
In February 2011, he was released from Ruch Radzionków. After tests, he signed a contract with Polonia Bytom.

References

External links
 

1982 births
Living people
Polish footballers
Polish expatriate footballers
People from Tarnowskie Góry
Sportspeople from Silesian Voivodeship
Association football midfielders
Ruch Radzionków players
Polonia Bytom players
Gwarek Zabrze players
Górnik Zabrze players
Stal Kraśnik players
Avia Świdnik players
Polish expatriate sportspeople in Cyprus
Expatriate footballers in Cyprus
Polish football managers